Sir Douglas Marshall (2 October 1906 – 24 August 1976) was a British businessman in insurance and banking and a Conservative Party politician, and Member of Parliament for Bodmin from 1945 to 1964.

Marshall was born on 2 October 1906 and he became a businessman in insurance and banking. In 1939 Marshall joined the Trade Division of the Admiralty and was commissioned in the Royal Naval Volunteer Reserve.

In the 1945 General Election he was elected as a Member of Parliament for Bodmin. At the 1964 general election, he lost his seat to the Liberal Party candidate Peter Bessell.

Marshall married Joan Annette Sherry in 1929 and they had one daughter, Joan died in 1952. He married Symons in 1953 and they had a daughter as well as four step-children.

References

UK General Elections since 1832  at Keele University

External links 
 

1906 births
1976 deaths
Conservative Party (UK) MPs for English constituencies
Members of the Parliament of the United Kingdom for Bodmin
UK MPs 1945–1950
UK MPs 1950–1951
UK MPs 1951–1955
UK MPs 1955–1959
UK MPs 1959–1964
Royal Navy officers
Royal Naval Volunteer Reserve personnel